In political jargon, a useful idiot is a term currently used to reference a person perceived as propagandizing for a cause—particularly a bad cause originating from a devious, ruthless source—without fully comprehending the cause's goals, and who is cynically being used by the cause's leaders. The term was often used during the Cold War to describe non-communists regarded as susceptible to communist propaganda and manipulation.

Origin 
The term "useful idiot", for a naive or unwitting person, was used in a British periodical as early as 1864, but to describe an opportunity to rebut them. In relation to the Cold War, the term appeared in a June 1948 New York Times article on contemporary Italian politics ("Communist shift is seen in Europe"), citing the centrist social democratic Italian paper L'Umanità. L'Umanità wrote that left-wing social democrats, who had entered into a popular front with the Italian Communist Party during the 1948 elections, would be given the option to either merge with the Communists or leave the alliance. The term was later used in a 1955 article in the American Federation of Labor News-Reporter to refer to Italians who supported Communist causes. Time magazine 
first used the phrase in January 1958, writing that some Italian Christian Democrats considered social activist Danilo Dolci a "useful idiot" for Communist causes. It has since recurred in that periodical's articles.

Related terms 

A similar term, useful innocents, appears in a 1946 Reader's Digest article titled "Yugoslavia's Tragic Lesson to the World", written by Bogdan Raditsa. Raditsa had served the Yugoslav government-in-exile during World War II, supported Josip Broz Tito's partisans (though not a Communist himself) and briefly served in Tito's new Yugoslav government before leaving for New York. "In the Serbo-Croat language," says Raditsa, "the communists have a phrase for true democrats who consent to collaborate with them for [the sake of] 'democracy'. It is Korisne Budale, or Useful Innocents," despite budale actually meaning fools in his language. In his 1947 book, Planned Chaos, Austrian-American economist Ludwig von Mises writes that the term useful innocents was used by Communists for liberals, whom von Mises describes as "confused and misguided sympathizers".

False attribution to Lenin 
The phrase useful idiot has often been attributed to Vladimir Lenin, but he is not documented as ever having used the phrase. In a 1987 article for The New York Times, American journalist William Safire investigated the origin of the term, commenting that a senior reference librarian at the Library of Congress had been unable to find the phrase in Lenin's works and concluding that in the absence of new evidence, the term could not be attributed to Lenin. Similarly, the Oxford English Dictionary in defining useful idiot says: "The phrase does not seem to reflect any expression used within the Soviet Union".

Select usage 
In 1959, Congressman Ed Derwinski of Illinois entered an editorial by the Chicago Daily Calumet into the Congressional record, referring to Americans who travelled to the Soviet Union to promote peace as "what Lenin calls useful idiots in the Communist game". In 1961, American journalist Frank Gibney wrote that Lenin had coined the phrase useful idiot. Gibney wrote that the phrase was a good description of "Communist follower[s]" from Jean-Paul Sartre to left-wing socialists in Japan to members of the Chilean Popular Front. In a speech in 1965, American diplomat Spruille Braden said the term was used by Joseph Stalin to refer to what Braden called "countless innocent although well-intentioned sentimentalists or idealists" who aided the Soviet agenda.

Writing in The New York Times in 1987, William Safire discussed the increasing use of the term useful idiot against "anybody insufficiently anti-Communist in the view of the phrase's user", including Congressmen who supported the anti-Contras Sandinistas in Nicaragua and the Dutch socialists. After President Ronald Reagan concluded negotiations with Soviet leader Mikhail Gorbachev over the Intermediate-Range Nuclear Forces Treaty, conservative political leader Howard Phillips declared Reagan a "useful idiot for Soviet propaganda."

See also

References

External links 

 Useful Idiots: The Documentary. BBC World Service. 2010.

Soviet phraseology
Political slurs for people